Harold Maurice Curran (10 June 1888 – 26 June 1971) was an Australian rules footballer who played with Melbourne in the Victorian Football League (VFL).

Notes

External links 

1888 births
Australian rules footballers from Victoria (Australia)
Melbourne Football Club players
1971 deaths